Chryseobacterium jejuense is a bacterium. It is aerobic, Gram-negative, non-motile, yellow-pigmented and straight rod-shaped. Its type strain is JS17-8(T) (=KACC 12501(T)=DSM 19299(T)).

References

Further reading

Whitman, William B., et al., eds. Bergey's manual® of systematic bacteriology. Vol. 4 and 5. Springer, 2012.
Van Wyk, Esias Renier. Virulence Factors and Other Clinically Relevant Characteristics of Chryseobacterium Species. Diss. University of the Freee State, 2008.

External links 
LPSN

Type strain of Chryseobacterium jejuense at BacDive -  the Bacterial Diversity Metadatabase

jejuense
Bacteria described in 2008